Burnie Airport , also called Burnie Wynyard Airport or Wynyard Airport, is a regional airport located adjacent to the town of Wynyard, about  west from Burnie, Tasmania, Australia. Formally named the Wynyard Aerodrome, the first official opening occurred on 26 February 1934. The Burnie Airport is majority owned by the Burnie City Council.

Airlines and destinations 

Rex Airlines operates services to and from Melbourne about 4 times per day using Saab 340 turboprop aircraft. Sharp Airlines offers flights to King Island and Launceston twice per day using a 19-seat Metro 23 (SA-227) turboprop aircraft. From 17 September 2021, QantasLink will launch direct seven weekly flights to Melbourne for the first time in 15 years with its 50-seat Q300 turboprop aircraft.

History of Burnie Airport
The first aerodrome at Wynyard was built by volunteers on an old racecourse. However, within a year of completion in 1932, the aerodrome was found to be too small for larger passenger and mail aircraft. A larger aerodrome was developed on the southern outskirts of the town and was officially opened on 26 February 1934. A further opening ceremony on 1 January 1935 was attended by the Prime Minister of the time, Joseph Lyons.

In the mid-1970s, Federal policy was adopted that would eventually see the ownership and maintenance of all airports outside of capital cities transferred from the Commonwealth to the respective local authorities. Under the new scheme, the future of the Wynyard Aerodrome was cast into doubt after Federal funding was secured for upgrading the Devonport Airport in August 1980; few if any areas of regional Australia had two major commuter and cargo airports only 60 km apart, which was the situation for Burnie/Wynyard and Devonport. After much political controversy, it wasn't until March 1985 that AU$5.2 million of funding was allocated by the State and Federal governments to upgrade the Wynyard aerodrome.

The upgraded aerodrome was officially opened on 15 February 1987, incorporating a sealed runway 1650m long. Ownership had been transferred from the Commonwealth to the Burnie Port Authority and the Wynyard Aerodrome was renamed to Burnie Airport. The airport's IATA code (the three-letter code appearing on luggage tags etc) was changed from WNY to BWT.

The Burnie Airport Corporation Unit Trust acquired the Burnie Airport from the Burnie Port Corporation in 2001. The Trust is 51% owned by the Burnie City Council and 49% owned by a private sector partner, the Australian Airports Association.

History of airlines and aircraft servicing Burnie Airport 
As early as 1933, Tasmanian Aerial Services was landing at Wynyard as part of a route from Western Junction (now Launceston Airport) to Latrobe (Devonport Airport was yet to be built), Smithton and King Island. T.A.S was the forerunner of Holyman Airways, which then became Australian National Airways (ANA). As was the case with many Australian airports, services to/from Wynyard during the Second World War were sporadic and limited to essential travel in support of the war effort. ANA resumed services between Melbourne's Essendon Aerodrome and Wynyard in January 1946, while the infant Trans Australia Airlines (TAA) received Commonwealth approval to commence services to Wynyard in November 1947. Both airlines operated Douglas DC-3 aircraft into Wynyard for most of the next decade, with occasional visits by DC-4 and Convair aircraft as they were displaced off the main capital city trunk routes by the arrival of more modern fleets of Douglas DC-6 and Vickers Viscounts. The only major change during this period came about through the takeover of Australian National Airways by Ansett in November 1957, forming Ansett-ANA.

Wynyard was one of the first regional airports to see service from the Fokker F27 Friendship, when both TAA and Ansett-ANA began receiving their new aircraft in 1959. The Friendship became the mainstay of both airlines' services to Wynyard and neighbouring Devonport during the 1960s, while Viscounts were also regular visitors as they moved onto regional routes following the delivery of Lockheed Electras, Boeing 727 and Douglas DC-9s for both airlines. In 1964, TAA began operating an internal 'supplemental' route between Hobart, Devonport, Wynyard and Smithton. The DC-3s initially used on the route proved too large, and these were replaced by eight-seat Beechcraft Queen Airs. This was the start of increasing moves by the major carriers to use 'light' aircraft on services within the states where the DC-3 and F27 proved too large.

By the 1970s, the Two Airline Policy which regulated the operations of the major airlines had been in place for decades. The practical effect of this policy obligated both airlines to operate a route with similar aircraft providing similar capacity, departing at similar times and charging identical fares. By this time, a large fleet of Ansett and TAA Fokker F27s was providing regional services in every state of Australia, alongside associated Ansett carriers such as Airlines of NSW, Airlines of South Australia and Western Australia's MacRobertson Miller Airlines (MMA). The Tamworth-based East-West Airlines also had a growing fleet of F27s and ambitions to expand beyond its network of routes connecting NSW country centres with Sydney.

As the 1980s dawned, Ansett and TAA were incurring heavy losses on many of their regional routes. A downturn in passenger traffic caused by an economic recession resulted in both carriers reviewing their networks. As the government-owned carrier, TAA faced political pressure from the conservative Fraser Liberal Government to control its costs, with some government members in favour of privatising the airline. TAA already co-operated with East-West Airlines, with passengers on TAA's capital city network interchanging onto regional routes operated by East-West (and vice versa). This was necessary for both airlines to compete against Ansett, which owned its own regional subsidiaries. By 1981, TAA had decided to withdraw its Fokker F27s from service and proceeded to formalise agreements with smaller carriers to take over those routes. This saw East-West's own fleet of F27s assume the services from Melbourne to Wynyard and Devonport during February 1982, competing against Ansett.

The future of Burnie Airport was under the microscope by the mid-1980s, as noted above. Devonport's upgrade to jet standard had been completed by 1983, and both East-West and Ansett (through subsidiary Air NSW) were operating Fokker F28 Fellowship twinjets to Sydney, and a mixture of F28s and F27s to Melbourne. The introduction of jets (and the route to Sydney) from Devonport caused Wynyard's passenger numbers to decline and the viability of both airlines servicing both airports was questioned. Wynyard's existing main runway 08/26 was too short for F28 operations, and was unable to be extended due to roads and sports fields at the western boundary and a residential area to the east. With the new jet-standard runway 09/27 constructed to the south of the existing runway, the airlines were placed under political pressure to upgrade their equipment from the F27 in order to justify the cost of construction. Ansett responded by scheduling an Air NSW F28 to operate the breakfast flight to Melbourne on two days a week, with the balance to still be operated by F27s. Also during 1987, a series of sales and takeovers resulted in East-West being bought by Ansett's parent company Ansett Transport Industries (ATI), and it became clear that both Burnie and Devonport Airports would be subject to some level of service rationalisation. ATI opted to make East-West the primary operator from Devonport, while the number of Ansett services would be reduced. At Wynyard, East-West services would be withdrawn by February 1988 with Ansett to remain as the sole operator. Around this time Ansett also announced that it was withdrawing the twice-weekly F28 service to Melbourne, and F27s would resume operating all services ahead of the imminent delivery of new Fokker F50 turboprops. VH-MMO had the distinction of operating the last Ansett Fokker F27 Friendship flight from Tasmania when it operated flight AN856 Wynyard-Melbourne on 22 July 1988.

1989 was to be a year of major change for Burnie Airport. Ansett's Fokker F50 service began to be disrupted as a result of industrial action by domestic airline pilots, culminating in the mass resignation on August 24 of pilots working for the major carriers Ansett, East-West and Australian Airlines, along with air-freight provider Ipec. This threw domestic travel into chaos and saw numerous airports, including Wynyard, lose most of their services overnight. Commuter airlines stepped into the breach as best they could (see below), while Ansett was able to use its subsidiary company Kendell Airlines to temporarily operate between Melbourne, Wynyard and Devonport using a mixture of Saab 340 and Fairchild Metroliners. Kendell pilots were not members of the same union as those working for Ansett and East-West, and thus they were unaffected by the industrial action. The return of small numbers of Ansett pilots allowed limited Fokker 50 services to resume to Wynyard, but ATI announced that Ansett was withdrawing from Burnie in order for Kendell Airlines to take over operations on a permanent basis using the Saab 340. Kendell was the sole operator connecting Burnie and Melbourne Tullamarine for the first half of the 1990s, before competition returned to the route in 1995 with the introduction of services by the Qantas regional affiliate Southern Australia Airlines using DeHavilland Canada Dash 8-100 aircraft.

Competition between the two airlines was disrupted by the collapse of Ansett Australia when the airline and its associated companies (including Kendell Airlines) ceased flying in the early hours of 14 September 2001. Kendell resumed limited services later in the month, with flights being temporarily routed via King Island. In August 2002, Kendell became part of the newly-formed Regional Express Airlines (Rex) and resumed flying at frequencies similar to those previously operated by Kendell, continuing to use the Saab 340. Qantaslink (by this time the umbrella brand for Qantas Group regional airlines) announced it would withdraw from the Burnie to Melbourne route in July 2006. This has left Regional Express as the sole operator in the period since. Qantaslink had announced intentions to resume the route effective from June 2021 but opted to defer until September, citing a downturn in demand due to ongoing COVID-19 travel restrictions between Tasmania and Victoria. The outbreak of COVID in 2020 caused Regional Express to dramatically reduce the frequency of services to Burnie in line with the general downturn in air travel experienced elsewhere, and services that did operate usually did so via King Island.

Numerous third-level carriers have also operated services to Burnie/Wynyard, with varying degrees of success. Aerial Services (Tasmania) was the first, established in 1968 to take over the intra-state routes TAA commenced operating with Queen Airs in 1964. This airline would be re-named Air Tasmania in 1973, with an ex-Ansett Douglas DC-3 as the main equipment. By 1980, Air Tasmania was using a mixture of Piper Navajo, Cessna Navajo and Embraer Bandierante aircraft on routes connecting Wynyard with King Island, Smithton, Devonport and Hobart. They were joined by Executive Airlines on the direct King Island to Wynyard route using aircraft including Aero Commanders and the GAF N22 Nomad. H.C Sleigh Airlines also operated a network of routes based out of Launceston which included Wynyard and used a mixture of Cessna 404s and Piper Navajos. A series of mergers between these carriers had, by 1982, resulted in the formation of Airlines of Tasmania. The new carrier went on a search for an aircraft that was larger than the Cessnas and Pipers, could carry a mixture of passengers and freight, was economical to operate and could cope with the frequently-strong crosswinds experienced on the Bass Strait islands. They settled on the four-engined De Havilland Heron, a number of which had been brought to Australia in the 1970s and re-engined with more powerful Lycoming engines to improve performance. Herons became the mainstay of Airlines of Tasmania's Launceston - Burnie - King Island route for most of the next decade, although at various times the airline also used an Embraer Bandierante or a Shorts 360. The need to replace the Herons at the end of their engineering lifespans saw Airlines of Tasmania enter a commercial arrangement with Tamworth-based regional airline Tamair in late 1994. Under the terms of this agreement the Herons were retired and a Fairchild Metroliner brought in from the Tamair fleet to take over the bulk of the flying to the Bass Strait islands. The collapse of the Tamair group in 1998 resulted in Airlines of Tasmania ceasing operations. Hobart-based Tasair emerged as the replacement operator for the King Island route, initially with a mixture of Piper Navajos and Aero Commanders before later using a British Aerospace Jetstream 31. Tasair ceased servicing Burnie in 2010, the airline subsequently entered voluntary liquidation in early 2012. Since 2012, the Launceston - Burnie - King Island route has been operated by regional carrier Sharp Airlines using Fairchild Metroliners. Since mid-2020, Sharp has also operated a twice-weekly service Hobart - Burnie - King Island, underwritten by the Tasmanian Government in order to support local tourism during the COVID pandemic.

Other operators to have served Burnie/Wynyard Airport in the past are Aus-Air from Melbourne's Moorabbin Airport with a fleet of Piper Navajos and Embraer Bandierantes, Geelong Flight Centre between Geelong's Grovedale Airport and Burnie via King Island using Navajos and Partenavia P.68's, and Philip Island Air Services flew a Cessna 402 from Cowes.

At-grade railway crossing
Until the early 2000s, Burnie was one of the few airports to have a railway line crossing an active runway, with the Western Line from Burnie to Wiltshire crossing through the northern end of runway 05/23. Until 1990, the airport was manned during operating hours by a Flight Service Unit (FSU) which provided traffic and weather information. The staff also had the ability to control the railway signalling system from the FSU office overlooking the airport. A series of lights on a console would advise whether the railway track section was occupied, and FSU staff could either set the signal facing the train to stop, or alternatively warn aircraft that a train was approaching or obstructing the runway. When FSU operations for the area were centralised to Melbourne, those controllers also took charge of the signalling mechanism. With equipment upgrades due that would render the remote control of the signals unworkable, the Civil Aviation Authority devised a solution based on the system successfully used in the New Zealand city of Gisborne, which also has a railway crossing the airport runway. Detectors installed on the railway tracks approaching the airport boundary would activate a series of red or green lights facing approaching trains or aircraft. Since then, the runway has been shortened to no-longer cross the railway line, but the old runway segment is still visible from aerial photography.

The railway line has not been in operation since 2003.

Notable accidents and incidents
On 12 January 1997, a Piper Aircraft Corp  PA-28R-180 suffered engine power loss during the initial climb shortly after takeoff. The pilot and two passengers suffered minor injuries as a result of the crash. The subsequent ATSB investigation was hindered by the badly damaged aircraft, but it was suspected that the air duct hose had collapsed resulting in reduced air supply to the engine. It was determined that the type of hose was not designated by the manufacturer to be installed in the air inlet system.

Statistics 
Burnie Airport was ranked 55th in Australia for the total number of revenue passengers served in the financial year 2016-2017.

See also

 List of airports in Tasmania

References

External links 
 Burnie Airport website

Airports in Tasmania
North West Tasmania
Burnie, Tasmania